Josh Rachele (born 11 April 2003) is a professional Australian rules footballer who plays for the Adelaide Crows in the Australian Football League (AFL).

He was selected by the Adelaide Crows with their first pick, the sixth overall, in the 2021 AFL draft. He previously played for the Murray Bushrangers in the NAB League and the Shepparton Swans Football Club in the Goulburn Valley League. He was educated at Notre Dame College, Shepparton and Caulfield Grammar School.

Rachele had had an opportunity to play soccer professionally but chose Australian rules football instead. He was part of the academy for Melbourne City FC and the under-17s Australian team.

He has Italian and Greek heritage.

AFL career

Rachele made an immediate impact at the Crows, kicking five goals on debut against Fremantle in the opening round of the 2022 AFL season.

References

External links

Living people
2003 births
Adelaide Football Club players
People educated at Caulfield Grammar School
Murray Bushrangers players
Australian people of Greek descent
Australian people of Italian descent
Australian rules footballers from Victoria (Australia)